Cherokee Hills is an unincorporated community in Sevier County, Tennessee, United States.  It is accessible via U.S. Route 411, near extreme eastern Sevierville.

Geography
Cherokee Hills has a mean elevation of 994 feet (303 metres).

References 

Unincorporated communities in Sevier County, Tennessee
Unincorporated communities in Tennessee